Bacchini and Bachini are Italian surnames. People with the names include:
 Benedetto Bacchini (1651–1721), Italian monk and man of letters
 Girolamo Bacchini, Italian castrato, composer, writer on music, and Roman Catholic priest
 John Bachini, English musician and television producer 
 Jonathan Bachini (born 1975), Italian footballer
 Matteo Bachini (born 1995), Italian footballer
 Paolo Bacchini (born 1985), Italian figure skater
 Romolo Bacchini (born 1872), Italian filmmaker, musician, painter and poet

See also
 Bacchini, a tribe of hoverflies.

Italian-language surnames